Patrick Joseph Lalor (19 July 1926 – 29 July 2016) was an Irish Fianna Fáil politician and former hurling player for Laois. He was a Teachta Dála (TD) for Laois–Offaly between 1961 and 1981, and a government minister on two separate occasions during the 19th Dáil. He later represented Leinster in the European Parliament from 1979 to 1994.

Hurling career
Lalor was a member of the Laois team that won the Leinster Senior Hurling Championship in 1949. The team went on to compete in the All-Ireland Senior Hurling Championship final but lost to Tipperary. Later that year he helped his club Abbeyleix to win the Laois Senior Hurling Championship. Between 1953 and 1956, Lalor was county secretary of Laois GAA.

He played football and hurling for his club and county for many years and is generally regarded as one of the most skillful hurlers to have pulled Laois jersey. This was evidenced by his selection in 1999 on the Laois Hurling Team of the Millennium.

Lalor played 70 times for Laois senior hurlers, scoring 199 points in his time with the senior team. At the time of his retirement, he was the all-time top scorer for the county and was top of the scoring charts for over 20 years. He also played five times for the senior footballers, scoring 13 points.

Political career
Lalor was elected to Dáil Éireann on his first attempt at the 1961 general election as a Fianna Fáil TD for Laois–Offaly in the 17th Dáil. In 1965, he was appointed Parliamentary Secretary to the Minister for Agriculture. The following year, Lalor became Parliamentary Secretary to the Minister for Transport and Power and Posts and Telegraphs. Following the 1969 election, Lalor joined the cabinet of Jack Lynch as Minister for Posts and Telegraphs. In the cabinet reshuffle that took place following the Arms Crisis in 1970, he took over the Industry and Commerce portfolio, serving in that position until the 1973 general election, when a Fine Gael–Labour Party coalition took power.

Fianna Fáil was re-elected in a landslide victory at the 1977 general election and Lalor became Government Chief Whip and Parliamentary Secretary to the Minister for Defence. In 1979, he was elected to the European Parliament for the Leinster constituency and did not stand for a fifth re-election in the 1981 general election. He was re-elected to the European Parliament in 1984 and 1989, before retiring from politics in 1994. During his time as a member of the European Parliament, he was vice-chair of the parliamentary grouping the European Progressive Democrats and its successor the European Democratic Alliance. He was also a Vice-President of the European Parliament from 1982 to 1987.

Personal life 
Lalor died on 29 July 2016 at the age of 90. He was survived by his four children. Fianna Fáil leader Micheál Martin paid tribute to Lalor saying he "had a very distinguished career and represented the people of Laois-Offaly with great pride."

References

External links

 

1926 births
2016 deaths
Fianna Fáil TDs
Irish sportsperson-politicians
Local councillors in County Laois
Members of the 17th Dáil
Members of the 18th Dáil
Members of the 19th Dáil
Members of the 20th Dáil
Members of the 21st Dáil
Laois inter-county hurlers
Abbeyleix hurlers
Politicians from County Laois
Fianna Fáil MEPs
MEPs for the Republic of Ireland 1989–1994
MEPs for the Republic of Ireland 1984–1989
MEPs for the Republic of Ireland 1979–1984
Ministers of State of the 21st Dáil
Parliamentary Secretaries of the 18th Dáil
Government Chief Whip (Ireland)
People from County Laois
Ministers for Enterprise, Trade and Employment